Rajapalayam may refer to:

Rajapalayam, a town in Virudhunagar district in the Indian state of Tamil Nadu
Rajapalayam (State Assembly Constituency), an assembly constituency located in Sivakasi Lok Sabha Constituency in Tamil Nadu
Rajapalayam dog, an Indian Sighthound
Rajapalayam block, a revenue block in the Virudhunagar district of Tamil Nadu, India